A kittel is a white linen or cotton robe worn by religious Ashkenazi Jews on holidays, in the synagogue or at home when leading the Passover seder. Kittels are sometimes worn by grooms. It is also customary for Jews to be buried in a kittel.

History 
In Ashkenazic tradition, married men wear a kittel in the synagogue on Yom Kippur.  In less-traditional synagogues, religious Jews - both men and women - wear a kittel.  The wearing of a kittel on the High Holidays is symbolically linked to its use as a burial shroud, and, to the verse "our sins shall be made as white as snow". Some wear a kittel when leading the Passover Seder. 

In some communities, the cantor wears a kittel on the first night of Selichot, the seventh day of the Holiday of Sukkot (also known as Hoshanah Rabbah), the Musaf prayers of Shemini Atzeret and the first day of Passover, where the prayers for rain (Tefilat HaGeshem) and dew (Tefilat HaTal) are respectively recited.

In some communities, a bridegroom wears a kittel on his wedding day.

In some parts of the Jewish world,  the kittel is known as a sargenes, related to the Old French serge as well as Latin serica.source?

Symbolism
As a shroud, the kittel signifies simple attire that assures equality for all in death. Because Jewish law dictates that the dead are buried without anything else in the coffin other than simple linen clothes, a kittel has no pockets.

The white color is said to symbolize purity, which partly explains its use during weddings. It is also felt to signify unity with the bride (who also wears white) and the beginning of a new life together.  Another reason it is worn at the wedding is because it has no pockets, showing that the couple is marrying for love, not for what they possess.

References

Bereavement in Judaism
Jewish religious clothing
Rosh Hashanah
Yom Kippur
Yiddish words and phrases
Jewish ritual objects
Yiddish words and phrases in Jewish law